The Magician's Nephew is a fantasy children's novel by C. S. Lewis, published in 1955 by The Bodley Head. It is the sixth published of seven novels in The Chronicles of Narnia (1950–1956). In recent editions, which sequence the books according to Narnia history, it is volume one of the series. Like the others, it was illustrated by Pauline Baynes whose work has been retained in many later editions. The Bodley Head was a new publisher for The Chronicles, a change from Geoffrey Bles who had published the previous five novels.

The Magician's Nephew is a prequel to the series. The middle third of the novel features the creation of the Narnia world by Aslan the lion, centred on a section of a lamp-post brought by accidental observers from London in 1900. The visitors then participate in the beginning of Narnia history, 1000 years before The Lion, the Witch and the Wardrobe (which inaugurated the series in 1950).

The frame story, set in England, features two children ensnared in experimental travel via "the wood between the worlds". Thus, the novel shows Narnia and our middle-aged world to be only two of many in a multiverse, which changes as some worlds begin and others end. It also explains the origin of foreign elements in Narnia, not only the lamp-post but also the White Witch and a human king and queen.

Lewis began The Magician's Nephew soon after completing The Lion, the Witch and the Wardrobe, spurred by a friend's question about the lamp-post in the middle of nowhere, but he needed more than five years to complete it. The story includes several autobiographical elements and explores a number of themes with general moral and Christian implications, including atonement, original sin, temptation and the order of nature.

Plot summary
The story begins in London during the summer of 1900. Two children, Digory  and Polly, meet while playing in the adjacent gardens of a row of terraced houses. They decide to explore the abandoned attic beyond Digory's house, but do not walk far enough, and find themselves in Uncle Andrew's study. Uncle Andrew tricks Polly into touching a yellow magic ring, causing her to vanish. Then he explains to Digory that he has been dabbling in magic, and that the rings allow travel between one world and another. He blackmails Digory into taking another yellow ring to follow wherever Polly has gone, and two green rings so that they both can return.

Digory finds himself transported to a sleepy woodland with an almost narcotic effect; he finds Polly nearby. The woodland is filled with pools. Digory and Polly surmise that the wood is not really a proper world at all but a "Wood between the Worlds", similar to the attic that links their houses back in England, and that each pool leads to a separate universe. They decide to explore a different world before returning to England, and jump into one of the nearby pools. They then find themselves in a desolate abandoned city of the ancient world of Charn.  Inside the ruined palace, they discover statues of Charn's former kings and queens, which degenerate from the fair and wise to the unhappy and cruel. They find a bell with a hammer and an inscription inviting the finder to strike the bell.

Despite protests from Polly, Digory rings the bell. This awakens the last of the statues, a witch queen named Jadis, whoto avoid defeat in battlehad deliberately killed every living thing in Charn by speaking the "Deplorable Word". As the only survivor left in her world, she placed herself in an enchanted sleep that would only be broken by someone ringing the bell.

The children recognise Jadis as evil and attempt to flee, but she follows them back to England by clinging to them as they clutch their rings. In England, she discovers that her magical powers do not work, although she retains her superhuman strength. Dismissing Uncle Andrew as a poor magician, she enslaves him and orders him to fetch her a "chariot"a hansom cabso she can set about conquering Earth. They leave, and she attracts attention by robbing a jewellery store in London. The police chase after her cab, until she crashes at the foot of the Kirke house. Jadis breaks off and tears an iron rod from a nearby lamp-post, using it to fight off police and onlookers when they mock her.

When Jadis threatens the crowd, Polly and Digory grab her and put on their rings to take her out of their worldalong with Uncle Andrew, Frank the cab-driver, and Frank's horse, Strawberry, who were all touching each other when the children grabbed their rings. In the Wood between the Worlds, Strawberry, looking to drink from one of the ponds, accidentally brings everyone into another world: a dark, empty void. At first, Digory believes it to be Charn, but Jadis recognises it as a world not yet created. They then all witness the creation of a new world by the lion Aslan, who brings stars, plants, and animals into existence as he sings. Jadis, as terrified by his singing as the others are attracted to it, tries to kill Aslan with the iron rod; but it rebounds harmlessly off him, and in the creative soil of the new world it sprouts into a growing lamp-post. Jadis flees in terror.

Aslan gives some animals the power of speech, commanding them to use it for justice and merriment or else risk becoming regular animals once again. King Frank and his wife are then crowned. Aslan confronts Digory with his responsibility for bringing Jadis into his young world, and tells Digory he must atone by helping to protect the new land of Narnia from her evil. Aslan transforms the cabbie's horse into a winged horse called Fledge, and Digory and Polly fly on him to a distant garden high in the mountains. Digory's task is to take an apple from a tree in this garden and plant it in Narnia. At the garden Digory finds a sign warning not to steal from the garden.

Digory picks one of the apples for his mission, but their overpowering smell tempts him. Jadis appears, having herself eaten an apple to become immortal, leaving her with pale white skin. She tempts Digory either to eat an apple himself and join her in immortality, or steal one to take back to Earth to heal his dying mother. Digory resists, knowing his mother would never condone theft, but hesitates. He sees through the Witch's ploy when she suggests he leave Polly behindnot knowing Polly can get away by her own ring. Foiled, the Witch departs for the North, and taunts Digory for his refusal to eat the apple and gain immortality. Digory returns to Narnia and plants the apple, which grows into a mature tree behind them while the coronation proceeds. Aslan tells Digory how the tree works – anyone who steals the apples gets their heart's desire, but in a form that makes it unlikeable. In the Witch's case, she has achieved immortality, but it only means eternal misery because of her evil heart. Moreover, the magic apples are now a horror to her, such that the apple tree will repel her for centuries to come, but not forever. With Aslan's permission, Digory then takes an apple from the new tree to heal his mother. Aslan returns Digory, Polly, and Uncle Andrew to England. Frank and his wife, Helen (transported from England by Aslan) stay to rule Narnia as its first King and Queen. The Narnian creatures live in peace and joy, and neither the Witch nor any other enemy will come to trouble Narnia for many hundreds of years.

Digory's apple restores his mother's health as his father returns for good after being away on business in India, and he and Polly remain lifelong friends. Uncle Andrew reforms and gives up magic, but still enjoys bragging about his adventures with the Witch. Digory plants the apple's core with Uncle Andrew's rings in the back yard of his aunt's home in London, and it grows into a large tree. Soon afterwards, Digory's family inherits a mansion in the country, and many years later the apple tree blows down in a storm. Digory, now a middle-aged professor, has its wood made into a wardrobe, setting up the events in The Lion, the Witch and the Wardrobe.

Principal characters

Digory Kirke: The boy who becomes the Professor in The Lion, the Witch and the Wardrobe
Polly Plummer: Digory's friend, who lives next door
Mabel Kirke: Digory's mother
Andrew Ketterley: Digory's uncle, a minor magician
Letitia Ketterley: Uncle Andrew's sister
Jadis: Empress of Charn, who becomes the White Witch appearing in The Lion, the Witch and the Wardrobe
Aslan: The Lion who creates Narnia and kills Jadis in The Lion, the Witch and the Wardrobe
King Frank: A cabby who becomes the first king of Narnia and forefather of the kings of Archenland
Queen Helen: The wife of King Frank, the first queen of Narnia, and the ancestress of the Archenlanders
Fledge: The winged horse, formerly the cab-horse Strawberry, who carries Polly and Digory to the mountain garden

Writing

Lewis had originally intended only to write the one Narnia novel, The Lion, the Witch and the Wardrobe. However, when Roger Lancelyn Green asked him how a lamp-post came to be standing in the midst of Narnian woodland, Lewis was intrigued enough by the question to attempt to find an answer by writing The Magician's Nephew, which features a younger version of Professor Kirke from the first novel.

The Magician's Nephew seems to have been the most challenging Narnia novel for Lewis to write. The other six Chronicles of Narnia books were written between 1948 and 1953, The Magician's Nephew was written over a five-year period between 1949 and 1954. He started in the summer of 1949 after finishing The Lion, the Witch and the Wardrobe, but came to a halt after producing 26 pages of manuscript and did not resume work until two years later. This may be as a result of the autobiographical aspects of the novel, as it reflects a number of incidents and parallels very close to his own experiences.

He returned to The Magician's Nephew late in 1950, after completing The Silver Chair. He managed to finish close to three-quarters of the novel, and then halted work once again after Roger Green, to whom Lewis showed all his writing at the time, suggested there was a structural problem in the story. Finally he returned to the novel in 1953, after finishing The Last Battle in the spring of that year and completed early in 1954.

Lewis originally titled the novel "Polly and Digory"; his publisher changed it to The Magician's Nephew. This book is dedicated to "the Kilmer family".

The Lefay Fragment

The original opening of the novel differs greatly from the published version, and was abandoned by Lewis. It is now known as 'The Lefay Fragment', and is named after Mrs Lefay, Digory's fairy godmother, who is mentioned in the final version as Uncle Andrew's godmother, a less benevolent user of magic, who bequeathed him the box of dust used to create the magic rings.

In the Lefay Fragment, Digory is born with the ability to speak to (and understand) trees and animals; the distinction between Talking and non-talking Beasts which was to become such a characteristic feature of the Narnian world is absent. Digory lives with an Aunt Gertrude, a former school mistress with an officious, bullying nature, who has ended up as a Government minister after a lifetime of belligerent brow-beating of others. Whenever his aunt is absent, Digory finds solace with the animals and trees, including a squirrel named Pattertwig. Polly enters the story as a girl next door who is unable to understand the speech of non-human creatures. She wants to build a raft to explore a stream which leads to an underground world. Digory helps construct the raft, but saws a branch from a tree necessary to complete it, in order not to lose face with Polly. This causes him to lose his supernatural powers of understanding the speech of trees and animals. The following day he is visited by his godmother Mrs Lefay who knows that Digory has lost his abilities and gives him a card with the address of a furniture shop which she instructs him to visit. At this point the fragment ends.

Pattertwig and Aunt Gertrude do not appear in the final version of the novel. Pattertwig does, however, appear as a Narnian creature in Prince Caspian, and Aunt Gertrude's career path is retraced by the Head of Experiment House in The Silver Chair.

Authenticity

Some doubt has been cast on the authenticity of the Lefay Fragment, as the handwriting in the manuscript differs in some ways from Lewis's usual style, and the writing is not of a similar calibre to his other work. Also in August 1963 Lewis had given instructions to Douglas Gresham to destroy all his unfinished or incomplete fragments of manuscript when his rooms at Magdalene College, Cambridge were being cleaned out, following his resignation from the college early in the month.

Autobiographical elements

A number of aspects of The Magician's Nephew parallel Lewis's own life. Both Digory and Lewis were children in the early 1900s, both wanted a pony, and both were faced with the death of their mothers in childhood. Digory is separated from his father, who is in India, and misses him. Lewis was schooled in England after his mother's death, while his father remained in Ireland. He also had a brother in India. Lewis was a voracious reader when a child, Digory is also, and both are better with books than with numbers. Digory (and Polly) struggle with sums when trying to work out how far they must travel along the attic space to explore an abandoned house, Lewis failed the maths entrance exam for Oxford University. Lewis remembered rainy summer days from his youth and Digory is faced with the same woe in the novel. Additionally Digory becomes a professor when he grows up, who takes in evacuated children during World War II.

The character of Andrew Ketterley also closely resembles Robert Capron, a schoolmaster at Wynyard School, which Lewis attended with his brother, whom Lewis suggested during his teens would make a good model for a villain in a future story. Ketterley resembles Capron in his age, appearance, and behaviour.

Style

The Magician's Nephew is written in a lighter tone than other Chronicles of Narnia books, in particular The Last Battle, which was published after. It frequently makes use of humour; this perhaps reflects the sense of looking back at an earlier part of the century with affection, and Lewis as a middle-aged man recalling his childhood during those years. There are a number of humorous references to life in the old days, in particular school life. Humorous exchanges also take place between Narnian animals. Jadis's attempt to conquer London is portrayed as more comical than threatening, and further humour derives from the contrast between the evil empress and Edwardian London and its social mores, and her humiliation of bumbling Andrew Ketterley after discovering he is not as powerful a sorcerer as she is (or was). This recalls the style of Edith Nesbit's children's books. Lewis was fond of these books, which he read in childhood, a number were set in the same period and The Magician's Nephew has some apparent references or homages to them.

Reading order

The Magician's Nephew was originally published as the sixth book in the Narnia Chronicles. Most reprintings of the novels until the 1980s also reflected the order of original publication. In 1980 HarperCollins published the series ordered by the chronology of the events in the novels. This meant The Magician's Nephew was numbered as the first in the series. HarperCollins, which had previously published editions of the novels outside the United States, also acquired the rights to publish the novels in that country in 1994 and used this sequence in the uniform worldwide edition published in that year.

Laurence Krieg, a young fan, wrote to Lewis, asking him to adjudicate between his views of the correct sequence of reading the novels – according to the sequence of events, with The Magician's Nephew being placed first – and that of his mother, who thought the order of publication was more appropriate. Lewis wrote back, appearing to support the younger Krieg's views, although he did point out that perhaps it would not matter what order they were read in.

Some literary scholars have argued that the publication order better draws the readers into the world of Narnia. In the book Lewis wrote first, Lucy Pevensie's discovery of the wardrobe that opens onto a forest and a mysterious lamp-post creates a sense of suspense about an unknown land she is discovering for the first time. This would be anticlimactic if the reader has already been introduced to Narnia in The Magician's Nephew and already knows the origins of Narnia, the wardrobe, and the lamp-post. Lewis scholar Peter Schakel points out that the narrative of The Magician's Nephew assumes that the reader has already read The Lion, the Witch and the Wardrobe and is now being shown its beginnings.

Paul Ford cites several scholars who have weighed in against the decision of HarperCollins to present the books in the order of their internal chronology, and continues, "most scholars disagree with this decision and find it the least faithful to Lewis's deepest intentions". These scholars argue that the narrative of The Magician's Nephew appears to assume that the reader has already read The Lion, the Witch and the Wardrobe and is now being shown its beginnings.

Themes and interpretations

Parallels with the Book of Genesis

Lewis suggested that he did not directly intend to write his Narnia stories as Christian tales, but that these aspects appeared subconsciously as he wrote, although the books did become Christian as they progressed. He thought that the tales were not direct representations or allegory, but that they might evoke or remind readers of Biblical stories. In The Lion, the Witch and the Wardrobe, Aslan is a Christ-like figure who suffers a death of atonement and returns to life in a similar way to Christ's crucifixion and resurrection. The Magician's Nephew has similar biblical allusions, reflecting aspects of the Book of Genesis such as the creation, original sin and temptation.

Parallels with events in the Book of Genesis include the forbidden fruit represented by an Apple of Life. Jadis tempts Digory to eat one of the forbidden apples in the garden, as the serpent tempts Eve into eating a forbidden fruit in the Garden of Eden; unlike Eve however, Digory rejects the offer. (Lewis's Perelandra also features a re-enactment of the same Biblical story, which in that book also ends with the tempter foiled and the fall avoided.)

While the creation of Narnia closely echoes the creation of the Earth in the Book of Genesis, there are a number of important differences.  Human beings are not created in Narnia by Aslan, they are brought into Narnia from our own world. Unlike Genesis, where souls are given only to human beings, animals and half-human half-animal creatures such as Fauns and Satyrs and even trees and watercourses are given souls and the power of rational thought and speech. This appears to suggest Lewis combined his Christian worldview with his fondness for nature, myth and fairy tales.

Parallels may also be found in Lewis's other writings. Jadis's references to "reasons of State", and her claim to own the people of Charn and to be beyond morality, represent the eclipse of the medieval Christian belief in natural law by the political concept of sovereignty, as embodied first in royal absolutism and then in modern dictatorships. Uncle Andrew represents the Faustian element in the origins of modern science.

The Holy Spirit and the breath of life

On a number of occasions in the Chronicles of Narnia, Aslan uses his breath to give strength to characters, demonstrating his benevolent power of bringing life. He specifically does so in The Magician's Nephew when a "long warm breath" gives life to Narnia. Lewis used the symbol of the breath to represent the Holy Spirit, also known as the Holy Ghost. Both spirit and ghost are translations of the word for breath in Hebrew and Greek. The flash from the stars when the Narnian animals are given the ability to talk also most probably represents the Holy Spirit or "breath of life" of Genesis chapter 2, as well as (possibly) the scholastic concept of the divine active intellect that inspires human beings with rationality.

Nature and a natural order

The Magician's Nephew suggests two opposing approaches to nature, a good approach associated with Aslan as creator and an evil approach associated with human deviation from divine intentions and the harmony of a natural order. On the one hand there is the beauty of Aslan's creation of Narnia, which is suggested as having a natural order by the use of musical harmony to bring landscapes and living things into being. There is also a distinct order to the process of creation, from earth to plants to animal, which evokes the concept of The Great Chain of Being. Lewis himself was a strong believer in the intrinsic value of nature for itself, rather than as a resource to be exploited. This is perhaps reflected in how Aslan also gives speech to spiritual aspects of nature, such as naiads in the water and dryads in the trees. Andrew Ketterley and Jadis represent an opposite, evil approach of bending the forces of nature to human will for the purpose of self gain. They see nature solely as a resource to use for their plans and thus disturb and destroy the natural order.

Influences

John Milton's Paradise Lost
The sacred Garden in the west of the Narnian world is surrounded by a "high wall of green turf" with branches of trees overhanging it, and "high gates of gold, fast shut, facing due east", which must be the only entrance because the travellers "walked nearly all the way round it" before they found them.  In all these points Lewis echoes John Milton's description of Eden in Paradise Lost:

The verdurous wall of Paradise up sprung...

And higher than that Wall a circling row
Of goodliest trees loaden with fairest fruit,
Blossoms and fruits at once of golden hue,
Appeerd, with gay enameld colours mixt...

One gate there only was, and that look'd east
On th' other side...

Jadis takes on echoes of Satan from the same work: she climbs over the wall of the Garden in contempt of the command to enter only by the gate, and proceeds to tempt Digory as Satan tempted Eve, with lies and half-truths.

Some details of the creation of Narnia, such as the emergence of animals from the ground, and the way they shake earth from their bodies are also similar to passages in Paradise Lost, and may also have been inspired by descriptions of the processes of nature in the seventh book of Edmund Spenser's The Faerie Queene.

The Garden of the Hesperides
Four years before the publication of the first Narnia book, Lewis had written as follows on the experience of reading really good poetry for the first time:
...I did not in the least feel that I was getting in more quantity or better quality a pleasure I had already known.  It was more as if a cupboard which one had hitherto valued as a place for hanging coats proved one day, when you opened the door, to lead to the garden of the Hesperides...

The element of the cupboard leading to a new world Lewis proceeded to use in The Lion, the Witch and the Wardrobe, but the snowy Narnia of that book is quite unlike the balmy Garden of the Hesperides, most of whose major mythological features appear as attributes of the sacred Garden in The Magician's Nephew where it differs from the Biblical or Miltonian Eden.  It is set in the far West of the world; it has a watchful guardian; a hero (Digory) is sent, like Hercules, to fetch an apple from it; a female villain (Jadis) steals another of the apples, like Eris.  Since the eponymous Hesperides were daughters of Hesperus, the god of the planet Venus in the evening, advocates of the planetary theory adduce this as evidence for a special association between The Magician's Nephew and Venus.

Edith Nesbit

Lewis read Edith Nesbit's children's books as a child and was greatly fond of them.  The Magician's Nephew refers to these books in the opening of the novel as though their events were true, mentioning the setting of the piece as being when "Mr. Sherlock Holmes was still living in Baker Street and the Bastables were looking for treasure in the Lewisham Road". The Bastables were children who appeared in a number of Edith Nesbit's stories. In addition to being set in the same period and location as several of Nesbit's stories, The Magician's Nephew also has some similarities with Nesbit's The Story of the Amulet (1906). This novel focuses on four children living in London who discover a magic amulet. Their father is away and their mother is ill, as is the case with Digory. They also manage to transport the queen of ancient Babylon to London and she is the cause of a riot; a very similar event takes place in The Magician's Nephew when Polly and Digory transport Queen Jadis to London and she also causes a similar disturbance.

J. R. R. Tolkien

The creation of Narnia may also have been influenced by his close friend J. R. R. Tolkien's The Silmarillion, which also contains a creation scene driven by the effect of music.

Morgan Le Fay and Pandora's Box

Lewis greatly enjoyed stories of Arthurian legend and wrote poetry about this world. Mrs Lefay visits Digory in The Lefay Fragment, and becomes Andrew Ketterley's nefarious godmother in the finished novel. She gives Ketterley a box from Atlantis containing the dust from which he constructs the rings Digory and Polly use to travel between worlds. Both Lefays are allusions to Morgan Le Fay, a powerful sorceress in a number of versions of King Arthur's tales, who is often portrayed as evil. The box itself is also evocative of Pandora's box from Greek myth, which also contained dangerous secrets.

The Atlantis legend

The box of dust enabling travel between worlds originated in Atlantis. Both Lewis and Tolkien were fascinated by the Atlantis legend. The degeneration of Charn's rulers, Jadis's ancestors, from the early kind and wise to the later cruel and arrogant is reminiscent of the similar degeneration in Tolkien's Númenor, the fabled island kingdom that finally sank under the waves due to the sinfulness of its latter inhabitants. The world of Charn was destroyed when Jadis spoke The Deplorable Word, a form of knowledge ancient Charnian scholars feared for its destructive potential. A number of commentators believed Lewis was referring to the use of the atomic bomb, used less than a decade earlier. It is perhaps more likely that Lewis was echoing the mythical destruction of Atlantis by the forces of evil and arrogance. As noted by Alice Ward, the comparison with nuclear arms is made explicit in Aslan's last warning: "You [Earth] are growing more like it [Charn]. It is not certain that some wicked one of your race will not find out a secret as evil as The Deplorable Word and use it to destroy all living things".

Adaptations

Theatrical
Aurand Harris was a well-known American playwright for children, whose works are among the most performed in that medium. He wrote 36 plays for children including an adaption of The Magician's Nephew. The play was first performed on 26 May 1984 by the Department of Drama, University of Texas, Austin and staged at the B. Iden Payne Theatre. A musical score by William Penn was written for use with productions of the play.

Erina Caradus wrote a playscript for The Magician's Nephew that was performed in Dunedin, New Zealand in 2005.

Film
An agreement among representatives of 20th Century Fox, Walden, and the C. S. Lewis estate determined that The Magician's Nephew would be the basis for the next movie following the release of the 2010 film The Voyage of the Dawn Treader. However, in October 2011, Douglas Gresham confirmed that Walden Media's contract with the C. S. Lewis estate had expired.

On 1 October 2013, the C.S. Lewis Company announced that they had entered into an agreement with producer Mark Gordon to jointly develop and produce The Chronicles of Narnia: The Silver Chair, ultimately deciding to continue releasing the films to mirror the novel series' publication order.

In October 2018, Netflix announced an agreement with the C.S. Lewis Company. Netflix will develop and produce new series and movies based on The Chronicles of Narnia. Mark Gordon of Entertainment One, Douglas Gresham and Vincent Sieber will serve as producers for films and executive producers for series.

TV
In 2003, the BBC produced a 10-part version read by Jane Lapotaire and signed by Jean St Clair wearing different Narnia-like clothes in British Sign Language, for the TV series Hands Up! which was first broadcast on the 16 January 2003. Jean signed in front of various high quality illustrations representing parts of the novel. It was later repeated on CBBC on the 3 December 2007, and BBC Two on the 16 September 2008.

Radio
A BBC Radio 4 adaptation exists. Focus on the Family also made an adaptation of this book with a full cast, sound editing, and music. Both productions adapted all seven books.

Manga
A HarperCollins Japan manga adaptation, began publication in 2018, before concluding in 2020 after two volumes.

Critical reception
T.M. Wagner of SF Reviews said "The Magician's Nephew may not be the best of the Narnia novels, but it's a brisk and funny tale certain to delight its intended young audience", saying that it may not satisfy readers in their teenage years and older.

Jandy's Reading Room reviewed the book, saying that although they feel it is the weakest of the series, they would still recommend it. They say it "gives a wonderful picture of the beginning of a new world, in the manner of the Creation."

Notes

References

Further reading

External links

 
  ——immediately, the full-colour C. S. Lewis centenary edition 
 

1955 British novels
1955 children's books
1955 fantasy novels
British novels adapted into plays
British novels adapted into television shows
Children's fantasy novels
Prequel novels
The Bodley Head books
The Chronicles of Narnia books
Witchcraft in written fiction